Invitation to Openness is an album by pianist Les McCann recorded in 1971 and released on the Atlantic label.

Reception

Allmusic gives the album 4 stars stating "Every nuance of McCann's stream of consciousness comes through loud and clear" calling it "an auditory delight for fusion fans".

Track listing 
All compositions by Les McCann
 "The Lovers" - 26:02
 "Beaux J. Poo Boo" - 13:06
 "Poo Pye McGoochie (and His Friends)" - 12:30

Personnel 
Les McCann - piano, electric piano, Moog synthesizer, arranger, conductor
Yusef Lateef - tenor saxophone, oboe, flute, pneumatic flute, plum blossom, temple bells
David Spinozza - guitar, electric guitar
Cornell Dupree - electric guitar
Corky Hale - harp
Jodie Christian - electric piano
Bill Salter - electric bass
Jimmy Rowser - bass
Donald Dean, Alphonse Mouzon, Bernard Purdie - drums, percussion
William "Buck" Clarke - African drums, percussion
Ralph McDonald - percussion
Jimmy Douglass-Recording Engineer
Fred Catero-Re-mix Engineer
Gene Paul-Mastering Engineer

References 

1972 albums
Les McCann albums
Atlantic Records albums
Albums produced by Joel Dorn